Zalmon Wildman (February 16, 1775 – December 10, 1835) was an American businessman and banker who served several months as a United States representative from Connecticut in 1835.

Biography 
He was born in Danbury, Connecticut where he completed preparatory studies. He was manufacturer of hats in Danbury—known as 'Hat City' --  and established the first hat shops from there in Charleston, South Carolina and Savannah, Georgia in 1802. In addition, he was the first president of Danbury National Bank from 1824 to 1826.

Wildman was a member of the Connecticut House of Representatives in 1818 and 1819. He was appointed postmaster of Danbury, Connecticut and served from April 9, 1805, to May 26, 1835. He was elected as a Jacksonian to the Twenty-fourth Congress and served from March 4, 1835, until his death in Washington, D.C., December 10, 1835. He was buried in Wooster Cemetery, Danbury, Connecticut.

See also
List of United States Congress members who died in office (1790–1899)

References

1775 births
1835 deaths
American manufacturing businesspeople
Members of the Connecticut House of Representatives
Politicians from Danbury, Connecticut
Connecticut postmasters
Jacksonian members of the United States House of Representatives from Connecticut
19th-century American politicians